= Voxvoganan =

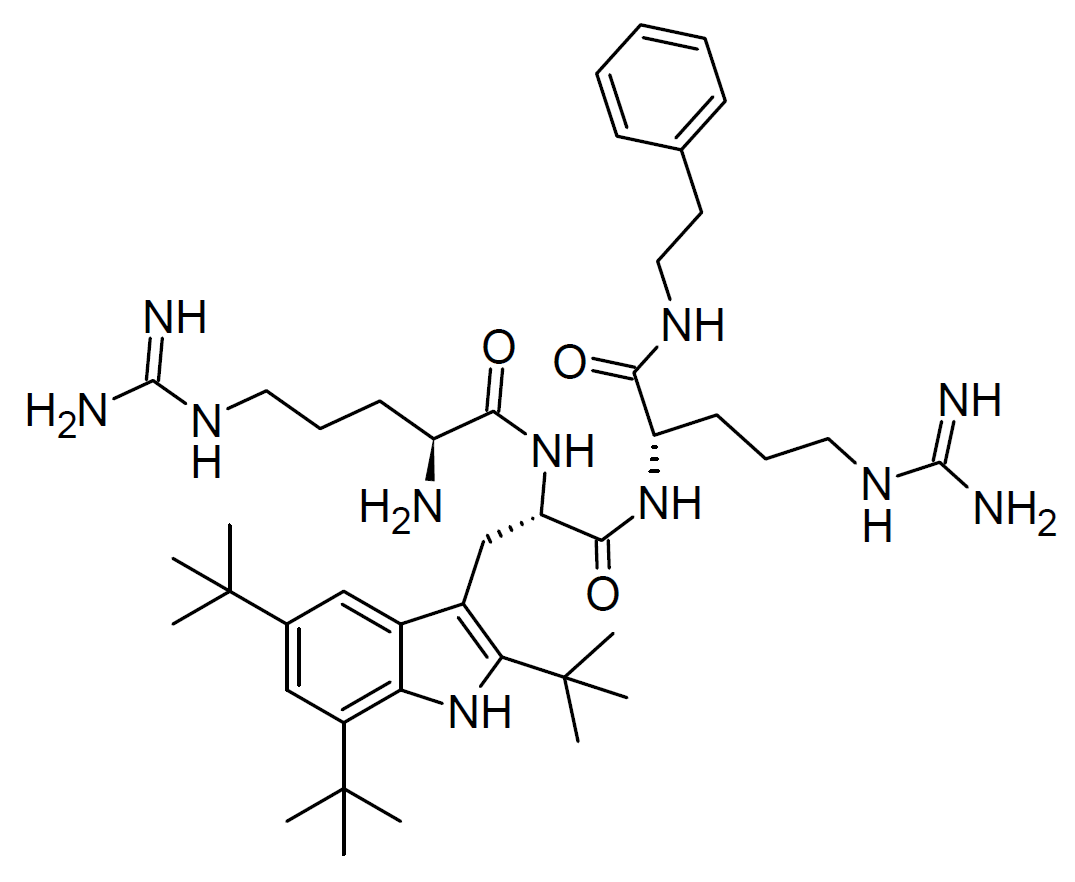

Clinical data
- Other names: Lytixar

Identifiers
- IUPAC name: (2S)-2-amino-5-(diaminomethylideneamino)-N-{(2S)-1-[[(2S)-5-(diaminomethylideneamino)-1-oxo-1-(2-phenylethylamino)pentan-2-yl]amino]-1-oxo-3-[2,5,7-tri-(tert-butyl)-1H-indol-3-yl]propan-2-yl}pentanamide
- CAS Number: 1166254-80-3
- PubChem CID: 25242323
- DrugBank: DB12711
- ChemSpider: 26611002
- UNII: HO813QDF65
- ChEBI: CHEBI:77752
- ChEMBL: ChEMBL1817968
- CompTox Dashboard (EPA): DTXSID20151467

Chemical and physical data
- Formula: C_{43}H_{69}N_{11}O_{3}
- Molar mass: 788.099 g·mol^{−1}
- 3D model (JSmol): Interactive image
- SMILES: CC(C)(C)C1=CC2=C(C(=C1)C(C)(C)C)NC(=C2C[C@@H](C(=O)N[C@@H](CCCN=C(N)N)C(=O)NCCC3=CC=CC=C3)NC(=O)[C@H](CCCN=C(N)N)N)C(C)(C)C
- InChI: InChI=1S/C43H69N11O3/c1-41(2,3)27-23-28-29(35(43(7,8)9)54-34(28)30(24-27)42(4,5)6)25-33(53-36(55)31(44)17-13-20-50-39(45)46)38(57)52-32(18-14-21-51-40(47)48)37(56)49-22-19-26-15-11-10-12-16-26/h10-12,15-16,23-24,31-33,54H,13-14,17-22,25,44H2,1-9H3,(H,49,56)(H,52,57)(H,53,55)(H4,45,46,50)(H4,47,48,51)/t31-,32-,33-/m0/s1; Key:ZVOYWSKEBVVLGW-ZDCRTTOTSA-N

Voxvoganan (LTX-109, Lytixar) is an experimental antibiotic medication for topical use. It is a synthetic peptide which is in clinical trials against skin infections caused by drug-resistant strains of Staphylococcus aureus.
